Schellenberg is a municipality in the lowland area of Liechtenstein, on the banks of the Rhine.

Schellenberg may also refer to:

 Schellenberg (surname)
 Hellenhahn-Schellenberg, a municipality in Westerwaldkreis, Rhineland-Palatinate, Germany
 Lordship of Schellenberg, a historic state of the Holy Roman Empire, now in Liechtenstein

See also
 
 Schellenberger, a surname